Birinchi May is a village in Jalal-Abad Region of Kyrgyzstan. It is part of the Bazar-Korgon District. Its population was 5,518 in 2021.

Population

References
 

Populated places in Jalal-Abad Region